Jacques Simon may refer to:

Jacques Simon (cyclist) (born 1938), French Olympic cyclist
Jacques Simon (field hockey), French Olympic hockey player
Jacques Simon (footballer) (1941–2017), French football player